Jam is the third studio album by British rock band Little Angels. It peaked at number one in the UK Albums Chart in 1993. 
The album features the band's biggest hit, "Womankind", which peaked at no. 12 during a five-week stay in the UK charts. The single "Too Much Too Young" features Canadian singer Bryan Adams on backup vocals, and also became a significant hit for the group, reaching no. 22. "Soap Box" and "Sail Away" were lesser hits, peaking at no. 33 and no. 45 respectively.

Reception

Allmusic gave the album a positive retrospective review, saying it "had all the ingredients of a major rock album -- powerful melodic guitar-based songs [...and] softer ballads".

Track listing

Personnel
Little Angels
 Toby Jepson – vocals, guitar
 Jimmy Dickinson - keyboards
 Mark Richardson – drums
 Mark Plunkett - bass
 Bruce John Dickinson - guitar

The Big Bad Horns
 "Big" Dave Kemp - saxophone
 Grant Kirkhope - trumpet
 Frank Mizen - trombone

Other
 Bryan Adams - backing vocals on "Too Much Too Young"

References

External links
 

1990 albums
Polydor Records albums